Two Minutes Past Nine is a podcast hosted by Leah Sottile and produced by BBC Radio 4.

Background 
The podcast tries to explain the ideology of Timothy McVeigh, who was responsible for the 1995 Oklahoma City bombing. Sottile argues that the bombing was deeply rooted in bigotry and anti-government convictions inspired by figures going as far back as John Wilkes Booth and more recent figures such as William Luther Pierce. The podcast discusses various people who believe that there will be a race war and that the government is attempting to take their guns. Sottile draws a connection between McVeigh, the Proud Boys, and the January 6 United States Capitol attack.

Format 
The podcast is a BBC Radio 4 program that was hosted by Leah Sottile and produced by Georgia Catt. The series included 12 episodes that were each roughly 15 minutes in length that were released in 2020.

Reception 
Nicholas Quah wrote in Vulture that the podcast was "refreshing for the sobriety of its presentation." Charlotte Runcie wrote in The Daily Telegraph that the podcast is "powerfully told ... [and] beautifully made."

See also 
 Bundyville
 No Compromise (podcast)
 List of podcasts about racism

References

External links 

2020 podcast debuts
2021 podcast endings
Audio podcasts
BBC Radio 4 programmes
Crime podcasts
History podcasts
Political podcasts